Ian S. Studd (born 1943) is a former middle-distance runner from New Zealand.

In 1966, Studd competed at the British Empire and Commonwealth Games in Kingston, Jamaica, winning the bronze medal in the men's mile.

External links 
 Profile at trackfield.brinkster.net

Living people
1943 births
New Zealand male middle-distance runners
Athletes (track and field) at the 1966 British Empire and Commonwealth Games
Commonwealth Games bronze medallists for New Zealand
Commonwealth Games medallists in athletics
Medallists at the 1966 British Empire and Commonwealth Games